Valerie Petts is a British watercolourist and book illustrator based in Oxford, England.

Petts is a member of the Oxford Art Society and undertakes some teaching. She has produced paintings for the monthly Limited Edition colour magazine of The Oxford Times. She has exhibited in England, Japan, and South Africa. As well as watercolours and oil paintings, Petts also produces limited edition prints.

Petts has produced many Oxford views, including of Port Meadow. In 2013, Petts exhibited a series of "In Memoriam" oil paintings of Port Meadow after Oxford University's Castle Mill development that has affected views of the Oxford skyline from the meadow, as part of the Oxfordshire Artweeks, at St Barnabas Church in Jericho, Oxford. She was featured in The Oxford Art Book.

Bibliography
Petts has contributed to a number of books:

 Consider England by Valerie Petts and Linda Proud, Shepheard-Walwyn (1994). .
 Oxford Words & Watercolours by Elaine Wilson and Valerie Petts, Oxford Limited (1997). .
 The Story of Lady Margaret Beaufort: Mother of Kings and Servant of God by Valerie Petts, St James Publishing (2002). .
 Hedges (Resource Management) by Murray MacLean and Valerie Petts, Farming Press (2003). .

References

External links
Valerie Petts website

Year of birth missing (living people)
Living people
Artists from Oxford
Artists from Oxfordshire
English landscape painters
English women painters
English printmakers
English watercolourists
Women printmakers
Women watercolorists
21st-century British women artists
21st-century English painters
British women illustrators
Writers who illustrated their own writing
21st-century English women